Sorin Daniel Cucu (born 17 June 1990) is a Romanian professional footballer who plays as a left-back for Championnat National 2 club Fleury.

External links
 Sorin Cucu at foot-national.com
 
 

1990 births
Living people
Sportspeople from Galați
Romanian footballers
Romanian expatriate footballers
Romanian expatriate sportspeople in France
Expatriate footballers in France
Association football defenders
ASC Oțelul Galați players
FC Delta Dobrogea Tulcea players
ASA 2013 Târgu Mureș players
FCM Dunărea Galați players
ASM Belfort players
US Pont-de-Roide players
US Granville players
Jura Sud Foot players
FC Fleury 91 players
Liga I players
Liga II players
Championnat National players
Championnat National 2 players